Visible panty line may refer to

Panty line, an outline of the underwear visible through clothes
Visible Panty Line (brand)
Visible Panty Line (book)